Tocapu (Tocapo or Tokapu) was a decorative artwork with discrete geometrical motifs. It was associated with Andean textiles, especially for the use of the Royals' clothing. Tocapu was also painted on wooden boards.

Motifs 
Tocapu was an integral part of the various textiles used in the Inca Empire. The designs were woven into the fabrics. In Tocapu, a nearly square frame inside a field is divided and subdivided into various geometric shapes.

Repeat Setting 
A repeat of the designs was combined following the suitability, for example, of repeating the single design unit or forming a group of units, such as a band (for example, a band on the bottom of uncu) or sometimes Tocapu motifs were given in a scattered way also (without any arrangement).

Study 
Tocapu used by Incas always remained a subject of research for assuming the existence of pictographic or ideographic writing.

About symbols and signs 
The Tocapu is evaluated more than decorative values.

Santacruz Pachacuti Yamqui himself explained

Gallery

References 

Textile arts of the Andes
Undeciphered writing systems